I Want to Believe may refer to:

I Want to Believe (song)
The X-Files: I Want to Believe